Checking In is an American sitcom television series and a spin-off of The Jeffersons that aired for four episodes on CBS from April 9 to April 30, 1981.

Synopsis
In the seventh-season finale episode of The Jeffersons, "Florence's New Job", the Jeffersons' maid, Florence Johnston (Marla Gibbs), accepted a job to become the executive housekeeper at the fictional St. Frederick Hotel in New York City. The series follows Florence's misadventures at the hotel with her co-workers: Lyle Block, her stuffy manager; Elena Beltran, her assistant; Earl Bellamy, the inept house detective; Hank Sabatino, the lewd handyman; Betty, the floor supervisor; Dennis, the bellboy; and Mr. Claymore, the hotel owner.

Cast
 Marla Gibbs as Florence Johnston
 Larry Linville as Lyle Block
 Ruth Brown as Betty
 Patrick Collins as Earl Bellamy
 Robert Costanzo as Hank Sabatino
Fezwick DaPoochie as Jack Niblick
 Jordan Gibbs as Dennis
 Liz Torres as Elena Beltran
 John Anderson as Mr. Claymore

Episodes

Reception
Checking In premiered on CBS on April 9, 1981, and lasted for only four episodes in the Thursday, 8:00 p.m. EST timeslot. Faced with low ratings, the series was cancelled, and the final episode aired on April 30, 1981. Gibbs then returned to her regular role on The Jeffersons and it was explained that the St. Frederick Hotel had burned down.

Checking In was the first All in the Family spin-off series that was not successful, unlike The Jeffersons, Maude and Maude spin-off Good Times.  Other failed spin-off attempts were Gloria in the 1982-1983 season and 704 Hauser in 1994.

Home media
The third episode, "Whose Side Are You On?", was added as a bonus feature on The Jeffersons: The Complete Series 33-disc DVD set issued by Shout! Factory.

References

External links
 

The Jeffersons
1981 American television series debuts
1981 American television series endings
1980s American sitcoms
1980s American black sitcoms
1980s American workplace comedy television series
CBS original programming
American television spin-offs
Television series by Sony Pictures Television
Television series set in hotels
Television shows set in New York City
English-language television shows